The Church of the Holy Spirit is a church located in  the district of Klostergården, on the south-west side of Lund in Skåne, Sweden. It was opened in 1968 as a district church in the Diocese of Lund, but became the main church of the parish of Helgeand   after it was formed in 1991.

The functionalistic church has thick brick walls, a campanile and a pulpit on the exterior designed for outdoor services. It has 23 church bells, of which twenty form a chime of bells and three are located in the campanile.

The architect behind the church was Sten Samuelson (1926-2002).

References

Other sources
Ahlberg, Bo, Queckfeldt, Eva & Übelacker, Walter  (2008) Helgeandskyrkan - Helgeands församling i Lund - framväxt och utveckling ( Lund: Arcus)

External links

Buildings and structures in Lund
Churches in Skåne County
Churches in the Diocese of Lund
20th-century Church of Sweden church buildings
Churches completed in 1968
20th-century establishments in Skåne County